Baker Field is a ballpark located in Sherman, Texas. It is home to the Austin College Kangaroos baseball team of the Southern Collegiate Athletic Conference. The venue holds a capacity of 400.

References

External links
 

Baseball venues in Texas
College baseball venues in the United States
Austin Kangaroos baseball
Buildings and structures in Grayson County, Texas